More than 1,500 life peerages have been created in the Peerage of the United Kingdom under the Life Peerages Act 1958.

List of life peerages (1958–1979)
Created under the premierships of Harold Macmillan, Sir Alec Douglas-Home, Harold Wilson, Edward Heath and James Callaghan
List of life peerages (1979–1997)
Created under the premierships of Margaret Thatcher and John Major
List of life peerages (1997–2010)
Created under the premierships of Tony Blair and Gordon Brown
List of life peerages (2010–present)
Created under the premierships of David Cameron, Theresa May, Boris Johnson, Liz Truss and Rishi Sunak

See also
List of members of the House of Lords
List of hereditary peers in the House of Lords by virtue of a life peerage
List of hereditary peers elected under the House of Lords Act 1999
List of law life peerages (1876-2005)
List of life peerages (1377-1876)

 
 
Life peers

Life peers
Life peerages